Mwimuto is an informal settlement in Kabete Constituency, Kiambu County and along Getathuru Road in the former Central Province. Mwimuto sits between the Wangige town of Kiambu County and Kitisuru, Nairobi County. Administratively, the area falls under Kiambu County. It sits right at the county border point.

Ethnicities

Mwimuto is a cosmopolitan settlement. Majority of its residents are of the Kikuyu and Luhya communities.

Economics Activities

The area is predominantly made up of informal businesses and trading is a major economic activity. Mwimuto also hosts a majority of household workers who provide janitorial and house-keeping services to the neighboring affluent Kitisuru, Lower Kabete, Spring Valley, and Loresho neighborhoods.

As of 2022 the area was experiencing a real estate boom with companies like Heri Homes setting up affordable housing projects in the area.

References 

Populated places in Central Province (Kenya)